"Maybe Tonight" is a 2006 song by Kate DeAraugo. 

Maybe Tonight may also refer to:

Music

Albums
Maybe Tonight, EP by Maggie Rose, or its title track
Maybe Tonight, album by Cathal Hayden 2002
Maybe Tonight, album by Joyside
Maybe Tonight, album by Four Men and a Dog
Maybe Tonight, EP by The Jolt, 1979

Songs
"Maybe Tonight" (Laura Branigan song), 1985
"Maybe Tonight" (Sandra song), 2012
"Maybe Tonight", song by Emmylou Harris from Last Date, 1983
"Maybe Tonight", English language song by Greek band Onirama
"Maybe Tonight", song by the Knack, from Get the Knack, 1979
"Maybe Tonight", song by The Summer Set from Legendary
"Maybe Tonight", song by William Tell, from You Can Hold Me Down
"Maybe Tonight", song by Murray McLauchlan
"Maybe Tonight", song by Lovelock on DJ-Kicks: Chromeo
"Maybe Tonight", song by Shawn Fogel on album Millions Of Miles Away
"Maybe Tonight", song by Magnum, from The Gathering, 1988
"Maybe Tonight", song and single by The Shirelles, 1964
"Maybe Tonight", song and single by Vince Gil from When Love Finds You, 1995
"Maybe Tonight", song by Earl Klugh from Sudden Burst of Energy, 1996
"Lovin' Tonight (Maybe Tonight)", song by The Arbors, 1969
"Maybe Tonight", song by Catch
"Maybe Tonight", song by Sandee from Only Time Will Tell
"Maybe Tonight", song by Brooke Allison, from Brooke Allison
"Maybe Tonight", song by Nicole Atkins, from Neptune City